The semicircular canals or semicircular ducts are three semicircular, interconnected tubes located in the innermost part of each ear, the inner ear. The three canals are the horizontal, superior and posterior semicircular canals.
[This section needs editing - different terms are used in diagram and later in the text.]

Structure

The semicircular canals are a component of the bony labyrinth that are at right angles from each other. At one end of each of the semicircular canals is a dilated sac called an osseous ampulla, which is more than twice the diameter of the canal. Each ampulla contains an ampullary crest, the crista ampullaris which consists of a thick gelatinous cap called a cupula and many hair cells. The superior and posterior semicircular canals are oriented vertically at right angles to each other. The lateral semicircular canal is about a 30-degree angle from the horizontal plane. The orientations of the canals cause a different canal to be stimulated by movement of the head in different planes, and more than one canal is stimulated at once if the movement is off those planes. The lateral canal detects angular acceleration of the head when the head is turned and the superior and posterior canals detect vertical head movements when the head is moved up or down. When the head changes position, the endolymph in the canals lags behind due to inertia and this acts on the cupula which bends the cilia of the hair cells. The stimulation of the hair cells sends the message to the brain that acceleration is taking place. The ampullae open into the vestibule by five orifices, one of the apertures being common to two of the canals.

Among species of mammals, the size of the semicircular canals is correlated with their type of locomotion. Specifically, species that are agile and have fast, jerky locomotion have larger canals relative to their body size than those that move more cautiously.

Horizontal semicircular canal
The lateral or horizontal canal (external semicircular canal) is the shortest of the three canals. Movement of fluid within this canal corresponds to rotation of the head around a vertical axis (i.e. the neck), or in other words, rotation in the transverse plane. This occurs, for example, when one turns the head from side to side.

Its ampullated end corresponds to the upper and lateral angle of the vestibule, just above the oval window, where it opens close to the ampullated end of the superior canal; its opposite end opens at the upper and back part of the vestibule. The lateral canal of one ear is very nearly in the same plane as that of the other.

Superior semicircular canal
The superior or anterior semicircular canal is a part of the vestibular system and detects rotations of the head in around the lateral axis, that is, rotation in the sagittal plane. This occurs, for example, when nodding one's head.

It describes about two-thirds of a circle. Its lateral extremity is ampullated, and opens into the upper part of the vestibule; the opposite end joins with the upper part of the posterior canal to form the crus commune, which opens into the upper and medial part of the vestibule.

Posterior semicircular canal
The posterior semicircular canal is a part of the vestibular system that detects rotation of the head around the antero-posterior (sagittal) axis, or in other words, rotation in the coronal plane. This occurs, for example, when one moves the head to touch the shoulders, or when doing a cartwheel.

It is directed superiorly, as per its nomenclature, and posteriorly, nearly parallel to the posterior surface of the petrous bone. The vestibular aqueduct is immediately medial to it. The posterior canal is part of the bony labyrinth and is used by the vestibular system to detect rotations of the head in the coronal plane. Its lower or ampullated end opens into the lower and back part of the vestibule, its upper into the crus commune.

Development
Findings from a 2009 study demonstrated a critical late role for BMP-2b in the morphogenesis of semicircular canals in the zebrafish inner ear. It is suspected that the role of BMP-2 in semicircular canal duct outgrowth is likely to be conserved between different vertebrate species.

Additionally, it has been found that the two semicircular canals found in the lamprey inner ear are developmentally similar to the superior and posterior canals found in humans, as the canals of both organisms arise from two depressions in the otic vesicle during early development. These depressions first form in lampreys between the 11 and 42 millimeter larval stages and form in zebrafish 57 hours post-fertilization

Function

The semicircular ducts provide sensory input for experiences of rotary movements. They are oriented along the pitch, roll, and yaw axes.

Each canal is filled with a fluid called endolymph and contains motion sensors within the fluids. At the base of each canal, the bony region of the canal is enlarged which opens into the utricle and has a dilated sac at one end called the osseous ampullae. Within the ampulla is a mound of hair cells and supporting cells called crista ampullaris. These hair cells have many cytoplasmic projections on the apical surface called stereocilia which are embedded in a gelatinous structure called the cupula. As the head rotates, the duct moves, but the endolymph lags behind owing to inertia. This deflects the cupula and bends the stereocilia within. The bending of these stereocilia alters an electric signal that is transmitted to the brain. Within approximately 10 seconds of achieving constant motion, the endolymph catches up with the movement of the duct and the cupula is no longer affected, stopping the sensation of acceleration. The specific gravity of the cupula is comparable to that of the surrounding endolymph. Consequently, the cupula is not displaced by gravity, unlike the otolithic membranes of the utricle and saccule. As with macular hair cells, hair cells of the crista ampullaris will depolarise when the stereocilia deflect towards the kinocilium. Deflection in the opposite direction results in hyperpolarisation and inhibition. In the horizontal canal, ampullopetal flow is necessary for hair-cell stimulation, whereas ampullofugal flow is necessary for the anterior and posterior canals.

This adjustment period is in part the cause of an illusion known as "the leans" often experienced by pilots. As a pilot enters a turn, hair cells in the semicircular canals are stimulated, telling the brain that the aircraft, and the pilot, are no longer moving in a straight line but rather making a banked turn. If the pilot were to sustain a constant rate turn, the endolymph would eventually catch up with the ducts and cease to deflect the cupula. The pilot would no longer feel as if the aircraft was in a turn. As the pilot exits the turn, the semicircular canals are stimulated to make the pilot think that they are now turning in the opposite direction rather than flying straight and level. In response to this, the pilot will often lean in the direction of the original turn in an attempt to compensate for this illusion. A more serious form of this is called a graveyard spiral. Rather than the pilot leaning in the direction of the original turn, they may actually re-enter the turn. As the endolymph stabilizes, the semicircular canals stop registering the gradual turn and the aircraft slowly loses altitude until impact with the ground.

History
Jean Pierre Flourens, by destroying the horizontal semicircular canal of pigeons, noted that they continue to fly in a circle, showing the purpose of the semicircular canals.

See also

 Ear
 Inner ear

References

Additional images

External links

 https://web.archive.org/web/20070616133210/http://www.bio.psu.edu/people/faculty/strauss/anatomy/nerv/innerear2.htm
 https://www.ncbi.nlm.nih.gov/books/NBK10863/
 http://www.britannica.com/EBchecked/topic/175622/human-ear/65037/Vestibular-system?anchor=ref531828

Ear
Sensory organs in animals
Vestibular system
Human head and neck